oDocs Eye Care is a New Zealand social enterprise. It was founded in 2014 by ophthalmologists Hong Sheng Chiong and Ben O'Keeffe in Wellington, New Zealand. The company sought to improve access to eye care by making affordable smartphone-based ophthalmic imaging devices. Their product, ODocs, was publicly disclosed in 2015 when he delivered the message at TEDxAuckland. In 2015, the company won the New Zealand Health Informatics Clinician challenge for the active project category.

References 

2014 establishments in New Zealand
Ophthalmic equipment
Medical technology companies of New Zealand